Khvajeh Ghias (also Romanized as Khvājeh Ghīās̄) is a village in Barvanan-e Markazi Rural District, Torkamanchay District, Meyaneh County, East Azerbaijan Province, Iran. At the 2006 census, its population was 564, in 135 families.

References

Populated places in Meyaneh County